is a former synchronized swimmer from Japan who competed in the 1988 Summer Olympics.

Miyako Tanaka-Oulevey is a Japanese sport psychologist, a PhD in System design and management, a certified mental training consultant in sport (CMTCS), 
public speaker, TV commentator, author, and a 1988 Seoul Olympic bronze medalist in synchronized swimming, duet. 
While assisting the US synchronized swimming Olympic head coach for 4 years in the US, she earned a master in sports management specializing in sport psychology. She earned a Ph.D. in system design and management. Her academic fields are performance enhancement, career transition, and stress coping. 
She is the author of more than 40 books (including Joint works), and routinely gives lectures, seminars or workshops at universities and companies. Olympic and professional Japanese athletes regularly consult with her regarding performance enhancement and career transitions. 
She is a mental coach for Japan's women's soccer national team and the Paralympic men's wheelchair basketball team.
She is a member of the IOC marketing committee and a member of the certification committee of the Japanese society of sport psychology.
Miyako lives with her husband and 2 children in Tokyo, Japan.

●Professional Memberships and Associations

Certified Mental Training Consultant in Sport, Japanese Society of Sports Psychology

Member, IOC marketing committee

References

1967 births
Living people
Japanese synchronized swimmers
Olympic synchronized swimmers of Japan
Synchronized swimmers at the 1988 Summer Olympics
Olympic bronze medalists for Japan
Olympic medalists in synchronized swimming
World Aquatics Championships medalists in synchronised swimming
Synchronized swimmers at the 1986 World Aquatics Championships
Medalists at the 1988 Summer Olympics
Academic staff of Biwako Seikei Sport College
20th-century Japanese women